Sereana Elina Naepi is a New Zealand academic and works at the University of Auckland. She is of Fijian and Pākehā descent.

Academic career
Naepi completed undergraduate study at the University of Auckland. Her 2012 master of arts thesis was titled: The Voices of Taciqu. Teaching and Learning Practices in Non-Lecture Settings for Māori and Pasifika Success in the First Year of a Bachelor of Arts. She moved to Canada for a  2018 PhD titled  'Beyond the Dusky Maiden : Pasifika women's experiences working in higher education'  at the University of British Columbia, before returning to the University of Auckland.

In 2021 Naepi received a Royal Society Te Apārangi Rutherford Discovery Fellowship award for 'Planning for Change: An analysis of neoliberalism, equity and change in higher education'.

Naepi is currently co-chair of the Royal Society Te Apārangi's Early Career Researcher Forum and on the MBIE Science Whitinga Fellowship Panel.

Selected works

References

External links
 
  

Living people
New Zealand women academics
Year of birth missing (living people)
University of Auckland alumni
Academic staff of the University of Auckland
University of British Columbia alumni
Academic staff of the University of British Columbia
Fijian academics
New Zealand sociologists
Fijian women academics